Vagabonds is the first solo album by American singer/songwriter and Jayhawks member Gary Louris, released in 2008.

Reception

Writing for Allmusic, critic Mark Deming praised the album, writing "Vagabonds manages to sound grand and organic at once, with the arrangements and production capturing a sense of the wide open spaces of Hollywood Town Hall and Rainy Day Music, especially on the beautifully heart-tugging "She Only Calls Me on Sundays," while also encompassing the more ambitious melodic conceits of Smile and Sound of Lies on tracks like "Black Grass" and "Omaha Nights." ... the result is an album that sounds full-bodied but natural and uncluttered, and gives Louris' fine songs plenty of room to reveal their virtues. Anyone who has followed the Jayhawks' career knows that Gary Louris is a major talent, and Vagabonds demonstrates he's still capable of making remarkable music outside the framework of the band."

Track listing
All songs written by Gary Louris
 "True Blue" – 5:02
 "Omaha Nights" – 4:04
 "To Die a Happy Man – 4:34
 "She Only Calls Me on Sundays" – 3:19
 "We'll Get By" – 4:29
 "Black Grass" – 5:14
 "I Wanna Get High" – 3:55
 "Vagabonds" – 5:27
 "D.C. Blues" – 4:15
 "Meandering" – 3:18

amazon.com Bonus Tracks
 "Baby Let Me Take Care Of You" – 4:54
 "Fall Day [Demo]" – 3:35

iTunes Bonus Tracks
 "Three Too Many" – 2:58
 "Working Girl [Demo]" – 3:10

Personnel
Gary Louris – vocals, guitar
Jonathan Wilson – organ, guitar, banjo, bass, vocals
Joshua Grange – pedal steel guitar
Otto Hauser – drums, percussion
Adam MacDougall – keyboards
Susanna Hoffs – choir
Jenny Lewis – choir
Chris Robinson – choir
Andy Cabic – choir

Technical personnel
Chris Robinson– producer
Thom Monahan – engineer
Ken Sluiter – assistant engineer
Jim Scott – mixing
Kevin Dean – mixing
Richard Dodd – mastering
Jeri Heiden – art direction, design
Darren Ankenman – photography

Chart positions

References

External links
Alone together again NoDepression magazine interview.

2008 albums
Rykodisc albums
Albums produced by Chris Robinson (singer)
Gary Louris albums